Steve Friesen (born April 12, 1977) is an American professional golfer who played on the Web.com Tour.

Friesen attended the University of Nebraska where in 1999 he won the Ben Hogan Award for the nations top scholar-athlete and was also named All-America honorable mention. He turned pro that year.

Friesen played on several mini-tours early in his career and also played on the Canadian Tour. He joined the Nationwide Tour in 2009 but sat out in 2010 due to injury. He returned to the Tour in August 2011 and won his second event of the year at the Price Cutter Charity Championship.

He is currently the Director of Instruction at Firethorn Golf Course in Lincoln, Nebraska.

Amateur wins
1998 Nebraska Amateur Stroke Play, Nebraska Amateur Match Play

Professional wins (6)

Nationwide Tour wins (1)

Other wins (5)
2001 Baton Rouge Open (US Pro Golf Tour)
2003 Waterloo Open, Utah Open
2005 New Mexico Open, Nevada Open

Source:

References

External links
 
 

American male golfers
Nebraska Cornhuskers men's golfers
Golfers from Nebraska
Golfers from Scottsdale, Arizona
Sportspeople from Lincoln, Nebraska
1977 births
Living people